The 2017 Antrim Senior Hurling Championship is the 117th staging of the Antrim Senior Hurling Championship since its establishment by the Antrim County Board in 1901. The winners receive the Volunteer Cup.

Ruairí Óg, Cushendall won in 2016, defeating Loughgiel Shamrocks by 1-15 to 1-12

Preliminary match

Quarter-finals

Semi-finals

Final

References

External links
 Antrim GAA website

Antrim Senior Hurling Championship
Antrim Senior Hurling Championship